João Vieira is an island in the Bijagós Archipelago of Guinea-Bissau. Its population is 6 (2009 census). It is part of the João Vieira and Poilão Marine National Park. Other nearby islands are Meio and Cavalos. The islands are important nesting grounds for sea turtles.

References

Bolama Region
Bissagos Islands